Propebela areta is a species of sea snail, a marine gastropod mollusk in the family Mangeliidae.

Description
The length of the shell attains 8.5 mm, its diameter 3.7 mm.

Distribution
This species occurs in the Sea of Japan.

They can be found in rock and muddy sand.

References

 P Bartsch. "The Nomenclatorial Status of Certain Northern Turritid Mollusks"; Proceedings of the biological Society of Washington 54, 1–14, 1941
 Higo, Shun'ichi, Paul Callomon, and Yoshihiro Gotō. Catalogue and bibliography of the marine shell bearing mollusca of Japan: Gastropoda, Bivalvia, Polyplacophora, Scaphopoda. Elle Scientific, 1999.

External links
 
 Biolib.cz: Propebela areta

areta
Gastropods described in 1941